Gaute Ormåsen (born 20 April 1983 in Brumunddal, Hedmark) is a Norwegian singer and was the Idol runner-up to Kurt Nilsen in 2003. He represented Norway in the Eurovision Song Contest 2022 along with Ben Adams as a part of pop band Subwoolfer.

He was offered a contract by BMG. 
He has also had a supporting role in the long running Norwegian television series Hotel Cæsar. In 2010, he took part in Melodi Grand Prix, the Norwegian preselection for the Eurovision Song Contest, singing "Synk eller svøm" reaching the second chance round without getting to the final and again in 2013 singing "Awake" reaching the final but failing to reach the top 4.

Personal life
Gaute Ormåsen has a twin brother, Hogne Ormåsen. His elder brother Henrik Ormåsen is a spokesman for Serve the People (Norway). He sings in Norwegian, Danish and English.

Discography

Albums

Singles

References

External links

Official website

1983 births
Living people
People from Ringsaker
Norwegian singer-songwriters
Norwegian pop singers
Idol (Norwegian TV series) participants
Melodi Grand Prix contestants
21st-century Norwegian singers
21st-century Norwegian male singers